Produksi Film Negara (State Film Productions, abbreviated as PFN) is an Indonesian state-owned film funding company, previously a film production company. PFN is one of the pioneers in Indonesian film industry at the time when it is formed.

PFN started as Java Pacific Film (JPF) which founded by Albert Balink in Batavia. JPF undergo several name changes before finally become PFN in 1975.

Film library

Lists of films 
As Java Pacific Film
 Pareh (1935)

As ANIF
 Terang Boelan (1937)

As PPFN/PFN
 Antara Bumi dan Langit (1950)
 Inspektur Rachman (1950)
 Untuk Sang Merah-Putih (1950)
 Djiwa Pemuda (1951)
 Rakjat Memilih (1951)
 Si Pintjang (1951)
 Penjelundup (1952)
 Sekuntum Bunga Ditepi Danau (1952)
 Mardi dan Keranya (1952)
 Sajap Memanggil (1952)
 Meratjun Sukma (1953)
 Belenggu Masjarakat (1953)
 Kopral Djono (1954)
 Kembali ke Masjarakat (1954)
 Si Melati (1954)
 Antara Tugas dan Tjinta (1954)
 Merapi (1954)
 Peristiwa Didanau Toba (1955)
 Djajaprana (1955)
 Rajuan Alam (1956)
 Tiga-Nol (1958)
 Ni Gowok (1958)
 Lajang-Lajangku Putus (1958)
 Kantjil Mentjuri Mentimun (1959)
 Daun Emas (1963)
 Kelabang Hitam (1977)
 Warok (1978)
 Si Pincang (1979)
 Yuyun Pasien Rumah Sakit Jiwa (1979)
 Harmonikaku (1979)
 Sinila (Peristiwa Gunung Dieng) (1979)
 Cita Pertiwi (1980)
 Si Gura-gura (1980)
 Laki-laki dari Nusakambangan (1980)
 Orang-Orang Laut (1980)
 Juara Cilik (1980)
 Hadiah Buat Si Koko (1980)
 Serangan Fajar (1981)
 Kereta Api Terakhir (1981)
 Dia yang Kembali (1982)
 Senja Masih Cerah (1982)
 Penumpasan Pengkhianatan G 30 S PKI (1982)
 Djakarta 1966 (1982)
 Film dan Peristiwa (1985)
 Penumpasan Sisa-sisa PKI Blitar Selatan (Operasi Trisula) (1986)
 Surat untuk Bidadari (1992)
 Pelangi di Nusa Laut (1992)
 Kuambil Lagi Hatiku (2019)

Film series and franchises 
 Si Unyil (1981-1993, 2002-2003)
 Si Huma (1983)

References

External links
 Official website

State-owned film companies
Government-owned companies of Indonesia
Film production companies of Indonesia
Mass media companies established in 1949
Indonesian companies established in 1949